The Grand Orient of Belgium (or G.O.B.) is a Belgian cupola of masonic lodges which is only accessible for men, and works in the basic three symbolic degrees of freemasonry.

History

The Grand Orient of Belgium was founded in 1833, three years after the independence of Belgium. The Grand Orient joins the Grand Orient of France and other Continental jurisdictions in not requiring initiates to believe in a Supreme Being (Great Architect of the Universe).  This meant that in the 1870s the Orient broke with the United Grand Lodge of England.

In 1921, the Grand Orient of Belgium was a founding and influential member within the International Masonic Association. It remained a member of this international alliance until 1950. During World War II, members of the Grand Orient of Belgium founded the Lodge Liberté chérie in a Nazi concentration camp and the Lodge l'Obstinée in a Nazi  prisoner-of-war camp.

In 1959 five lodges of the Grand Orient of Belgium founded the Grand Lodge of Belgium in order to regain recognition by the United Grand Lodge of England which was lost in 1979. The Grand Orient of Belgium became a founding member of the Centre de Liaison et d'Information des Puissances maçonniques Signataires de l'Appel de Strasbourg (CLIPSAS) in 1961, but left in 1996 with the Grand Orient of France over disputes about the place of religious belief. In 1989 the Grand Orient of Belgium, the Grand Lodge of Belgium, the Women's Grand Lodge Of Belgium and the Belgian Federation of Le Droit Humain signed an agreement of mutual recognition. In 1998, these anti-clerical and atheistic Grand Orients founded the International Secretariat of the Masonic Adogmatic Powers (SIMPA), but by 2008, the Belgium Grand Orient had rejoined CLIPSAS.

Grand Masters
 1833 - 1835 : Joseph-Marie de Frenne 
 1835 - 1842 : Goswin de Stassart
 1842 - 1854 : Eugène Defacqz
 1854 - 1862 : Théodore Verhaegen
 1866 - 1868 : Joseph Van Schoor
 1869 - 1871 : Pierre Van Humbeek
 1871 - 1874 : Auguste Couvreur
 1875 - 1877 : Henri Bergé
 1877 - 1880 : Auguste Couvreur
 1881 - 1883 : Henri Bergé
 1896 - 1898 : Henri Bergé
 1884 - 1886 : Eugène Goblet d'Alviella
 1887 - 1889 : Victor Lynen
 1890 - 1892 : Ernest Reisse
 1893 - 1895 : Auguste Houzeau de Lehaie
 1899 - 1901 : Gustave Royers
 1902 - 1904 : Fernand Cocq
 1905 - 1907 : Jean-Laurent Hasse
 1908 - 1910 : Joseph Descamps
 1911 - 1913 : Fernand Cocq
 1914 - 1921 : Charles Magnette
 1922 - 1924 : Fernand Levêque
 1925 - 1927 : Charles Magnette
 1928 - 1930 : Raoul Engel
 1931 - 1933 : Victor Carpentier
 1934 - 1936 : Paul Erculisse
 1936 - 1944 : François Bovesse
 1944 - 1944 : Jules Hiernaux
 1945 - 1947 : Leonce Mardens
 1947 - 1950 : Edmond Troch 
 1950 - 1953 : Walther Bourgeois 
 1954 - 1957 : Robert Hamaide
 1957 - 1959 : Leopold Remouchamps
 1960 - 1961 : Georges Beernaerts
 1962 - 1962 : Charles Castel 
 1963 - 1965 : Henri Bonet
 1966 - 1968 : Robert Dille
 1969 - 1971 : Victor-Gaston Martiny
 1971 - 1974 : Pierre Burton
 1974 - 1977 : Jaak Nutkievitz
 1977 - 1981 : Nicolas Bontyès
 1981 - 1984 : André-Louis Mechelynck
 1984 - 1987 : Sylvain Loccufier
 1987 - 1990 : Guy Vlaeminck
 1990 - 1993 : Louis Dengis
 1993 - 1996 : Dimitri Sfingopoulos
 1996 - 1999 : Pierre Klees
 1999 - 2001 : Adolphe Adolphy
 2005 - 2008 : Henri Bartholomeeusen
 2008 - 2011 : Bertrand Fondu
 2011 - 2014 : Jozef Asselbergh
 2014 - 2017 : Marc Menschaert
 2017 - 2020 : Henry Charpentier
 2020 - present : Alain Cornet

Notable members

 Jules Anspach, 1829–1879.
 Jules Bordet, 1870–1961, Nobel Prize in Physiology or Medicine (1919)
 , 1890–1944.
 Léo Campion, 1905–1992.
 Charles De Coster, 1827–1879.
 Ovide Decroly, 1871–1932.
 Eugène Goblet d'Alviella, 1846–1925.
 Victor Horta, 1861–1947.
 Paul Hymans, 1865–1941, first President of the League of Nations
 Henri La Fontaine, 1854–1943, Nobel Peace Prize (1913)
 Charles-Joseph de Ligne, 1735–1814.
 Charles Magnette, 1863–1937.
 Constantin Meunier, 1831–1905.
 Edmond Picard, 1836–1924.
 Jean Rey, 1902–1983, second President of the European Commission
 Félicien Rops, 1833–1898.
 Goswin de Stassart, 1780–1854, First Grand Master 1833 - 1841,
 Emile Vandervelde, 1866–1938.
 Théodore Verhaegen, 1796–1862, Grand Master 1854 - 1862, founder of the Université Libre de Bruxelles
 Henri Vieuxtemps, 1820–1881.

Relationship with the Roman Catholic Church
The GOB has often had a difficult relationship with the Roman Catholic Church (see Catholicism and Freemasonry). The Grand Orient was seen as the main source of anticlericalism during the end of the 19th century and the beginning of the 20th century.

See also
 Freemasonry in Belgium
 History of Freemasonry in Belgium
 International Secretariat of the Masonic Adogmatic Powers
 Regular Grand Lodge of Belgium

References

 Hugo De Schampeleire, Els Witte, Fernand V. Borne, Bibliografische bijdrage tot de geschiedenis der Belgische vrijmetselarij, 1798-1855, Brussel 1973
 Andries Van den Abeele, De Kinderen Van Hiram, Brussel, Roularta, 1991
 Hervé Hasquin (ed.), Visages de la franc-maçonner ie belge du XVIIIe au XXe siècle, Ed. ULB, Bruxelles, 1983
 Michel Huysseune, Vrijmetselarij, mythe en realiteit, EPO pub., 1988
 , La franc-maçonnerie en Belgique, Bruxelles 1988

External links
 

 
Belgium, Grand Orient of
Organizations established in 1833
Freemasonry in Belgium
1833 establishments in Belgium